Ceglie Messapica is a railway station in Ceglie Messapica, Italy. The station is located on the Martina Franca-Lecce railway. The train services and the railway infrastructure are operated by Ferrovie del Sud Est.

Train services
The station is served by the following service(s):

Local services (Treno regionale) Martina Franca - Francavilla Fontana - Novoli - Lecce

References

Railway stations in Apulia
Buildings and structures in the Province of Brindisi